Empress Shi (史皇后, personal name unknown) was an empress during Xin Dynasty.  She married emperor Wang Mang, in spring 23 CE, as his Xin Dynasty was crumbling.  Despite that, he married her as a public show of confidence.  She was the daughter of one of his officials, Shi Chen (史諶).

In autumn 23, the Xin Dynasty's capital Chang'an fell to agrarian rebels, who were seeking to re-establish the Han Dynasty.  Emperor Wang Mang died in the battle for the main palace, Weiyang Palace.  It is not known what happened to Empress Shi, although it is known that her father, Shi Chen, surrendered to the Han forces and was executed.

|-

Shi, Empress
1st-century Chinese women
1st-century Chinese people